A Crime of One's Own is a 1967 crime novel by the British writer Edward Grierson.

Synopsis
The owner of a bookshop in provincial England with a fertile imagination. He becomes convinced that one of his customers is operating as part of an enemy spy ring. He follows her home, but when she is founded murdered with a paper knife from his office, he is arrested and put on trial for the crime.

References

Bibliography
 Reilly, John M. Twentieth Century Crime & Mystery Writers. Springer, 2015.
 White, Terry. Justice Denoted: The Legal Thriller in American, British, and Continental Courtroom Literature. Praeger, 2003.

1967 British novels
Novels by Edward Grierson
British crime novels
Chatto & Windus books
Novels set in England